The Varaždin Arena is a multi-use indoor arena in Varaždin, Croatia. It is used mostly for team handball, volleyball and basketball games. The stadium has a capacity of 5,400 and was officially opened on 6 December 2008. It was completed to be used as one of the venues during the 2009 World Men's Handball Championship hosted in Croatia. It hosted all the Group C matches which consisted of Germany, Macedonia, Algeria, Poland, and Russia.  

The arena was also used to host the 2018 European Men's Handball Championship and will be hosting 2025 World Men's Handball Championship. 

The arena has played host to various events other than sports, such as dancing championships, various expos, school affiliated events, circuses, auto-shows, and concerts.  In its short history the arena hosted numerous artists such as: Đorđe Balašević, Zdravko Čolić, Limp Bizkit, Mišo Kovač,  Dino Merlin, Plavi Orkestar, Gibonni, Bambi Molesters, Halid Bešlić, Crvena Jabuka and Parni Valjak.

Concerts & events
 Tony Cetinski performed a concert during the Karlovačko Live 2012 - December 26, 2012
 Lijepom našom HRT television music show held the filming event  - December 5, 2012
 Gregorian (band) performed a concert during their Epic Chants World Tour 2013 - April 5, 2013
 2Cellos  performed a concert  - June  1, 2013
 Les Misérables (Jadnici) the musical was performed  - September  27, 2013
 Severina Vučković performed a sold-out concert during her Dobrodošao u Klub Tour  - November 8, 2013
 Goran Bregović performed a concert promoting his album Champagne for the Gypsies  - November 30, 2013
 Klape i Tamburaši performed a joined concert - December 6, 2013
 Neno Belan & Fiumens held a Big Christmas concert  - December 20, 2013

Gallery

See also
 List of indoor arenas in Croatia
 List of indoor arenas in Europe

References

External links
Arena Varazdin
Facebook address
Davis Cup: Croatia vs Ecuador, march 2010

Handball venues in Croatia
Indoor arenas in Croatia
Arena
Arena